The Pigeon Will Ride the Roller Coaster! is a children's book by Mo Willems. Published in 2022 by Union Square Kids, it is about a pigeon who experiences a loop-de-loop of emotions before his first roller coaster ride.

Reception
The Pigeon Will Ride the Roller Coaster! is a New York Times and IndieBound bestseller.

The book received a starred review from Booklist, who highlighted the book's illustrations: "Willems’ spare illustrations put the spotlight right where it belongs, on Pigeon’s incredibly expressive body language, flapping and flopping through the comic panels." Kirkus Reviews wrote, "Roller-coaster enthusiasts or not, children will eagerly join our intrepid hero on this entertaining ride." Further, they noted, "Willems’ trademark droll illustrations will have readers giggling."

Adaptation
In 2022, Weston Woods Studios released an animated short based on The Pigeon Will Ride the Roller Coaster! narrated by Willems and directed by Pete List.

References
{{

2022 children's books
American picture books
Fictional passerine birds
The New York Times Best Seller list